S. P. Shunmuganathan (born 9 September 1954) is an Indian politician and former member of the Tamil Nadu Legislative Assembly from Srivaikuntam constituency. He is the former Minister for Milk and Dairy Development.

Family and early life 
S. P. Shunmuganathan was born on 9 September 1954 in Pandaravailai in Thoothukudi district of Tamil Nadu. His father, Ponnaiah Nadar was a Payilvan (Gym master) and Teacher. Shunmuganathan finished his Siddha degree in Kumbakonam. His wife Asha, five daughters and a son.

Political career 
He joined All India Anna Dravida Munnetra Kazhagam (AIADMK) in 1972. He served as the unopposed Panchayat secretary of Perungulam, Perungulam town secretary, Srivaikuntam union secretary, Presently he is the AIADMK's secretary of south Thoothukudi District.
In 2001 election he selected as MLA of Srivaikuntam constituency.

In 2006 Tamil Nadu assembly elections, he lost to D. Selvaraj of Indian National Congress by 1,632 votes in the Srivaikuntam constituency.
In 2011 Tamil Nadu assembly election he was elected from the Srivaikundam constituency and served as a minister for Hindu religious and charitable endowments in J. Jayalalithaa's cabinet. He was sacked as Minister for Rural Industries in November 2011 as part of the third cabinet reshuffle in a five-month period by Jayalalithaa. 

In June 2013 he was appointed as minister of  Tourism and Tourism development.

In 2016 Assembly elections Shunmuganathan won in Srivaikuntam Constituency against Indian National Congress candidate Rani Venkatesan. After that he became minister of Milk and Dairy Development under J. Jayalalithaa's sixth term. He was released from cabinet on 29 August 2016 due to unknown reason.

References 

All India Anna Dravida Munnetra Kazhagam politicians
Living people
1954 births
People from Thoothukudi district
Tamil Nadu MLAs 2001–2006
Tamil Nadu MLAs 2011–2016
Tamil Nadu MLAs 2016–2021